Mit Rucksack und Harpune is the fourth studio album released by Joachim Witt in 1985.

Track listing
All music and lyrics by Joachim Witt; except where noted.
 "Blonde Kuh"  "Blonde Cow"  (music: Harald Gutowski) - 3:22
 "Strom"  "River"  - 3:28
 "When I Fall in Love (Mit Dir)"  "When I fall in love (with you)"  (music: Peter Sawatzki) - 3:48
 "Zick-Zack-Zucker-Rock" - 3:32
 "No- No- No- No" - 5:42
 "Mi Amor" - 5:46
 "Das Supergesicht"  "The Superface"  - 4:55
 "Rucksack- Idiot"  "Backpack- Idiot"  - 4:15
 "Sahib (Combat-DaDa-Video)" (music: Hans Bäär, Rüdiger Braune, Rüdiger Elze) - 3:52

Personnel
Joachim Witt - vocals
Rüdiger Elze - guitar
Hans Bäär - bass
Klaus Voormann - keyboards
Rudiger Braune - drums

1985 albums
Joachim Witt albums